formerly known as "Aichi Prefectural University of Fine Arts and Music" is a public university in the city of Nagakute in Aichi Prefecture, Japan. The university was established in 1966 and is located in a hilly area on the eastern outskirts of Nagoya. The campus covers an area of approximately 410,000 square meters, with university facilities blending in with the surrounding nature and greenery.

History

1966 – Aichi Prefectural University of Fine Arts and Music is establishedThe Painting, Sculpture, and Design Divisions are established in the Department of Fine Arts, Faculty of ArtThe Composition, Voice, and Instrumental Music (Piano, Strings) Divisions are established in the Department of Music, Faculty of MusicNaoteru Ueno assumes office as the first President
1970 – Graduate School (Master Course) opensThe Painting, Sculpture, and Design Divisions are established in the Graduate School of Fine ArtsThe Composition, Voice, and Instrumental Music (Piano, Strings) Divisions are established in the Graduate School of Music
1972 – Shinichiro Kozuka assumes office as the second President
1977 – Masaaki Oshita becomes acting president upon the death of Shinichiro KozukaMasuto Toyooka assumes office as the third President
1983 – Takashi Kono assumes office as the fourth President
1985 – Student exchange agreement between Aichi Prefectural University of Fine Arts and Music and Nanjing Academy of Fine Arts is signed
1989 – The Faculty of Art is expanded to include the Department of Design and Craft; the Design Division is transferred from the Department of Fine Arts to the Department of Design and Craft; the Ceramics Division is established in the Department of Design and CraftThe Painting Division in the Department of Fine Arts, Faculty of Art is reorganized into the Japanese Painting and Oil Painting DivisionsThe Winds and Percussion Course is introduced in the Instrumental Music Division of the Department of Music, Faculty of MusicMuseum of Horyuji Mural Reproductions opensYoshikado Tatehata assumes office as the fifth President
1993 – The Painting Division is subdivided into the Japanese Painting and Oil Painting Divisions, and the Ceramics Division is introduced, in the Graduate School of Fine Arts
1994 – The Composition (Musicology) Course is established in the Composition Division of the Department of Music, Faculty of MusicThe Composition (Musicology) Course is established in the Composition Division, along with the establishment of the Instrumental Music (Winds and Percussion) Courses in the Instrumental Music Division, Graduate School of Music
1995 – Makoto Kawakami assumes office as the sixth President
2001 – The Art History, Art Theory and Conservation Division is established in the Department of Fine Arts, Faculty of ArtShozo Shimada assumes office as the seventh President
2007 – Aichi Prefectural University of Fine Arts and Music becomes independent, now run by the Aichi Public University CorporationThe Master Course is reorganized; as a result, the five Divisions of the Graduate School of Fine Arts are combined into a single division, while the three divisions of the Graduate School of Music are combined into a single divisionTeruo Isomi assumes office as the eighth President
2009 – Graduate School (Doctor Course) opensDoctor Courses are now established in the Fine Arts Division, the Graduate School of Fine Arts, and the Music Division of the Graduate School of Music, respectively.

Departments

Department of Fine Arts
(Includes undergraduate and graduate school programs)
Japanese Painting
Oil Painting
Sculpture
Art History, Art Theory and Conservation Division
Craft&Design
Design
Ceramics

Department of Music
(Includes undergraduate and graduate school programs)
Composition
Composition
Musicology
Vocal Music
Instrumental Music
Piano
String Instruments
The Winds and Percussion

Organisation & Facilities
University Art Museum
University Library
Sogakudo Concert Hall
Museum of Horyuji Mural Reproductions Virtual tour of the Museum of Horyuji Mural Reproductions
Center for Promoting Fine Arts and Music
Art Information Center
Art Education/Student Support Center
Administration Office
Student Dormitory

Artists
Yoshitomo Nara (Artist)
Atsuko Ishizuka (Film director, animator)
Yukinobu Hoshino (Manga artist)

Musicians
Hiro Fujikake (Composer/Conductor/Producer/Synthesizer player)
Yuko Kawai (Pianist)
Shigenobu Nakamura (Composer)
Michiru Yamane (Composer)

Faculty members
Fram Kitagawa (Art director)
Tsuneyuki Morita (Conservation Science)
Yuzo Toyama (Conducting)
Hiroyuki Yamamoto (Composition)

International Exchanges
Nanjing Arts Institute (China)
Edinburgh College of Art (United Kingdom)

Contact information
Aichi Prefectural University of Fine Arts and Music 1-1 Sagamine Nagakute, Aichi, Japan

Notes

External links

  

Music schools in Japan
Art schools in Japan
Public universities in Japan
Aichi Prefectural University of the Arts
Educational institutions established in 1966
1966 establishments in Japan
Nagakute, Aichi